Habaengnyeo or Habaengnyeorang was the daughter of Habaek, and the mother of Chumo the Holy of Goguryeo, the founder of the kingdom of Goguryeo. She was also given the name Yuhwa in Samguk Sagi and Samguk Yusa.

Mythological overview
Habaek, the god of the Amnok River, had three beautiful daughters: Yuhwa, Hwonhwa, and Wihwa. The sisters were playing on the riverside, but ran away when they saw Hae Mosu approaching them. To lure the ladies, Hae Mosu built an exquisitely decorated palace and held a banquet. After the sisters came into the palace and became drunk, Hae Mosu attempted to block the exit, and was able to capture Yuhwa.

Outraged by kidnapping of Yuhwa, Habek sent his messenger to scold Hae Mosu. Ashamed by his own actions, Hae Mosu tried to let Yuhwa go, but Yuhwa refused to leave because she had fallen in love with him. To solve the problem, Hae Mosu summoned a chariot drawn by five dragons and went to Habaek's palace. When they arrived, Habaek challenged Hae Mosu to a duel of metamorphosis.
   
Habaek transformed into a carp, a pheasant, and a deer, only to be caught by Hae Mosu when he transformed into an otter, a hawk, and a wolf respectively. Witnessing the talent of Hae Mosu, Habaek held a banquet to celebrate the marriage. Once the couple became drunk, Habaek put them into a leather bag, and loaded it into the dragon chariot to ascend the couple to Heaven. However, Hae Mosu woke up in the middle of the journey, and ran away to Heaven alone by cutting the leather bag with Yuhwa's golden hairpin.

When Yuhwa came back alone, Habaek saw her as a disgrace to the family. Habaek had her lips stretched out, and exiled her to Wubalsu (or Wubal Pond), located at the south of Taebaeksan (or Taebaek Mountain) along with two servants.

One day a fisherman reported to Geumwa of Buyeo that a strange creature was strolling underwater. The king ordered the capture of the creature, and Yuhwa was pulled out from the water. Because her lips were stretched, they had to be cut three times for her to speak. The king realized that she was the concubine of Son of the Heaven, thus kept her in a detached palace where the sunlight followed Yuhwa and made her pregnant.

Family
 Father: Habaek (하백)
 Sister: Wuihwa (위화)
 Sister: Hweonhwa (훤화) 
 Husband: Geumwa of Dongbuyeo (금와왕)
 Husband: Hae Mo-su of Buyeo (해모수왕)
 Son: Dongmyeong of Goguryeo (동명성왕)

Popular culture
 Portrayed by Oh Yeon-soo in the 2006–2007 MBC TV series Jumong.
Portrayed by Kim Ji Yeong in the 2017 KBS TV series Chronicles of Korea.

Sources
 Samguk Yusa, by Il-yeon

See also 
 List of Korean monarchs
 History of Korea
 Three Kingdoms of Korea

References 

Korean royal consorts
Buyeo people
Goguryeo people